Csehipuszta (Csehi-Puszta, meaning "Czech Puszta") may refer to:

 Csehipuszta (Iregszemcse), nearby Iregszemcse
 Hungarian name of Șimleu Silvaniei, Sălaj County